Samuel Marsden (25 June 1765 – 12 May 1838) was an English-born priest of the Church of England in Australia and a prominent member of the Church Missionary Society. He played a leading role in bringing Christianity to New Zealand. Marsden was a prominent figure in early New South Wales and Australian history, partly through his ecclesiastical offices as the colony's senior Church of England cleric and as a pioneer of the Australian wool industry, but also for his employment of convicts for farming and his actions as a magistrate at Parramatta, both of which attracted contemporary criticism.

Early life
Born in Farsley, near Pudsey, Yorkshire in England as the son of a Wesleyan blacksmith turned farmer, Marsden attended the village school and spent some years assisting his father on the farm.  In his early twenties his reputation as a lay preacher drew the attention of the evangelical Elland Society, which sought to train poor men for the ministry of the Church of England. With a scholarship from the Elland Society Marsden attended Hull Grammar School, where he became associated with Joseph Milner and the reformist William Wilberforce, and after two years, he matriculated, at the age of 25, at Magdalene College, Cambridge. He abandoned his degree studies to respond to the call of the evangelical leader Charles Simeon for service in overseas missions. Marsden was offered the position of second chaplain to the Reverend Richard Johnson's ministry to the Colony of New South Wales on 1 January 1793.

Marsden married Elizabeth Fristan at Holy Trinity, Hull on 21 April 1793. The following month William Buller, the Bishop of Exeter, ordained him as a priest.

In Australia

Marsden travelled as a passenger on the convict ship,  to Australia, his first child Anne being born en route. He arrived in the colony on 2 March 1794, and set up house in Parramatta,  outside the main Port Jackson settlement.

In 1800 Marsden succeeded Johnson and became the senior Church of England chaplain in New South Wales; he would keep this post until his death.

Marsden was given grants of land by the colonial government and bought more of his own, which were worked with convict labour, a common practice in Australia at the time. By 1807 he owned  of land. Successful farming ventures provided him with a secure financial base, although they also formed a plank of contemporary criticism of Marsden for alleged over-involvement in non-church affairs. In 1807 he returned to England to report on the state of the colony to the government, and to solicit further assistance of clergy and schoolmasters.

He concentrated on the development of strong heavy-framed sheep such as the Suffolk sheep breed, which had a more immediate value in the colony than the fine-fleeced Spanish merinos imported by John Macarthur. In 1809, Marsden was the first to ship wool to England from Australia for commercial use; this was made into cloth by Messrs W. & J. Thompson, at Rawdon, West Yorkshire, and so impressed George III that he was given a present of Merino sheep from the Windsor stud. Four years later more than 4000 lbs (1814 kg) of his wool was sold in England. Marsden was an important promoter of the wool staple, even though his contribution to technology, breeding and marketing was far eclipsed by that of Macarthur. He is believed to have later introduced sheep to New Zealand, where he would develop a somewhat gentler reputation than in Australia.

In 1795, Governor John Hunter made the chaplains magistrates. Marsden's role as magistrate at Parramatta, attracted criticism in his lifetime. History has remembered Marsden as the "Flogging Parson", with contemporaries claiming that he inflicted severe punishments (notably extended floggings), even by the standards of his day. This view of Marsden is disputed in some circles as part of an anti-clerical writing of history, in turn attributed to a dislike of Roman Catholics and the Irish.

Joseph Holt, who was transported to Sydney following his negotiated surrender after the Irish Rebellion of 1798, gave vivid account in his memoirs of the search for Irish plotters in which he was arrested. Marsden was held to be involved in this secret action by the authorities. Holt himself was released but witnessed the fate of others. He related: "I have witnessed many horrible scenes; but this was the most appalling sight I had ever seen.  The day was windy and I protest, that although I was at least fifteen yards to the leeward, from the sufferers, the blood, skin, and flesh blew in my face", as floggers "shook it off from their cats" (referring to the cat-of-nine-tails scourging lash). He continued "The next prisoner who was tied up was Paddy Galvin, a young lad about twenty years of age; he was also sentenced to receive three hundred lashes. The first hundred were given on his shoulders, and he was cut to the bone between the shoulder-blades, which were both bare. The doctor then directed the next hundred to be inflicted lower down, which reduced his flesh to such a jelly that the doctor ordered him to have the remaining hundred on the calves of his legs .... 'you shall have no music out of my mouth to make others dance upon nothing'. Some have written that Marsden ordered such treatment but Holt's memoirs do not explicitly link Marsden to the floggings at Toongabbie on that day. Holt's memoirs express his impression of Marsden, as "a busy meddling man, of shallow understanding" who thought himself "a great lawyer". Holt believed that Marsden tried to intimate to Holt that his wife and children were free, but he was not. Holt considered that he had surrendered back in Ireland under terms of free exile. But when the Holt family arrived in Parramatta, Marsden, Aitkins and Dr Thomson called on them and asked Holt to accompany them to Toongabbie, where Captain Johnstone tried to assign him to the overseer Michael Fitzgerald. The next day the Governor was to come to Parramatta and Holt determined to ask the Governor, determined to "have the highest authority, even the Governor himself, and not submit to the whims of understrappers, who always assume tenfold the airs that their superiors might be supposed to have" (his opinion of Marsden). The Governor confirmed he was free.

Marsden's attitudes to Irish Roman Catholic convicts were illustrated in a memorandum which he sent to his church superiors during his time at Parramatta:

Despite Marsden's opposition to Catholicism being practised in Australia, Governor Philip Gidley King permitted monthly Catholic Masses in Sydney from May 1803, although these were to take place under police surveillance.

In 1806, Marsden was the originator of the New South Wales "Female Register" which classed all women in the colony (excepting some widows) as either "married" or "concubine". Only marriages within the Church of England were recognised as legitimate on this list; women who married in Roman Catholic or Jewish ceremonies were automatically classed as concubines. The document eventually circulated within influential circles in London, and is believed to have influenced contemporary views of the Australian colony as a land of sexual immorality, some of which survived into 20th century historiography.

In 1809, Marsden was in England. There he befriended the Maori chief Ruatara who had gone to Britain in the whaling ship Santa Anna and been stranded there. Marsden and Ruatara returned together on the convict transport Ann (or Anne), which was under the command of Captain Charles Clarke and which carried some 198 male convicts. They arrived in Sydney on 17 or 27 February 1810. Ruatara stayed with Marsden at Parramatta for some time, and again in 1811 after a failed attempt to reach New Zealand. Ruatara eventually reached New Zealand where he did more to facilitate Marsden's mission to the Maori than any other native.

In 1822, Marsden was dismissed from his civil post as a Parramatta magistrate (along with several other officials) on charges of exceeding his jurisdiction.

During his time at Parramatta, Marsden befriended many Māori visitors and sailors from New Zealand. He cared for them on his farm, providing accommodation, food, drink, work and an education for up to three years. He gave one Māori chief some land on which he could grow his own crops and taught other Māori to read and write English. He learnt Māori, beginning an English-Māori translation sheet of common words and expressions.

Marsden described himself as first and foremost a preacher. His sermons therefore are important primary documentation in Marsden studies. There are approximately 135 sermons written by Marsden in various collections around the world. The largest collection is in the Moore Theological College Library in Sydney, Australia. These sermons reveal Marsden's attitudes to some of the controversial issues he faced, including magistrates, the aboriginal people and wealth. A transcription of the Moore College collection can be found online.

Of Aboriginal People he wrote that "The Aborigines  are the most degraded of the human race … The time has not yet arrived for them to receive the blessings of civilisation and the knowledge of Christianity".

Mission to New Zealand

Background
Marsden was a member of the Church Missionary Society (CMS) (founded in 1799) and remained formally based in New South Wales, but developed an interest in evangelising New Zealand from the early 1800s onwards. Europeans had known of New Zealand since the 1640s and by the early 19th century there had been increasing contact between Māori and Europeans, mainly by the many whalers and sealers around the coast of New Zealand and especially in the Bay of Islands. A small community of Europeans had formed in the Bay of Islands, made up of explorers, flax traders, timber merchants, seamen, and ex-convicts who had served their sentences in Australia (as well as some who had escaped the Australian penal system). Marsden was concerned that they were corrupting the Māori way of life, and lobbied the Church Missionary Society to send a mission to New Zealand.

In June 1813, Marsden wrote to the Secretary of the CMS seeking £500 per annum to form an Auxiliary CMS Society in New South Wales, with a view of assisting engaging in missionary work among the Māori people in New Zealand. At a meeting in the Colony of New South Wales, held at Sydney, on 20 December 1813, Marsden formed the New South Wales Society for affording Protection to the Natives of the South Sea Islands, and promoting their Civilization, for the protection of South Sea Islanders who may be brought to Port Jackson, and to defend their claims on the masters and owners of the vessels who mistreat those islanders.

First trip to New Zealand

Thomas Kendall and William Hall sailed on the Earl Spencer, departing on 31 May 1813 to the Bay of Islands, New Zealand, on a voyage of investigation, and returned to Sydney on 10 October.

In 1814, he purchased a brig, the Active, for £1,400, mostly with his own money as the Church Missionary Society refused to provide funds for a ship. Lay missionaries Thomas Kendall, John King and William Hall were chosen for the New Zealand mission and departed on the Active from Sydney on 14 November 1814. The missionaries, Kendall, King and Hall, together with free settler Thomas Hansen, arrived in Rangihoua Bay on 22 December 1814. With them were the first horses in New Zealand, a stallion and two mares, brought from Australia by Marsden.

Marsden met Māori rangatira (chiefs) from the Ngāpuhi iwi (tribe), who controlled the region around the Bay of Islands, including the chief Ruatara who had lived with him in Australia, and a junior war leader, Hongi Hika, who had helped pioneer the introduction of the musket to Māori warfare in the previous decade. Hongi Hika returned with them to Australia on 22 August.

The first known Christian sermon on land in New Zealand was preached by Marsden at Oihi Bay (a small cove in the north-east of Rangihoua Bay) on Christmas Day, 1814. The service from the Church of England Book of Common Prayer was read in English but it is likely that, having learnt the language from Ruatara, Marsden preached his sermon in the Māori language. Ruatara was prevailed upon to explain those parts of the sermon the 400-strong Māori congregation did not understand.

On 24 February 1815 Marsden purchased land at Rangihoua for the first Christian mission in New Zealand. The death of Ruatara on 15 March 1815 and the loss of his protection for the mission may have contributed to a lack of growth of European settlement in the area and its displacement, in the 1820s, by the Kerikeri as the senior mission in New Zealand. By the 1830s the houses of the mission at Oihi had deteriorated and the mission moved to Te Puna, further to the west in Rangihoua Bay. The mission finally closed in the 1850s.

Establishment of the mission

At the end of the year Kendall, Hall and King returned to start a mission to the Ngāpuhi under Ruatara's (and, later, Hongi Hika's) protection in the Bay of Islands.  Hongi Hika returned with them, bringing a large number of firearms from Australia for his warriors.

A mission station was founded with a base at Rangihoua Bay, later moved to Kerikeri, (where the mission house and stone store can still be seen), and ultimately a model farming village at Te Waimate. The mission would struggle on for a decade before attracting converts, in competition with Wesleyan and Catholic missions. Thomas Kendall abandoned his wife for the daughter of a Māori tohunga (priest), and also flirted with Maori traditional religion.

In 1815 the Ngāpuhi chief Tītore went to Sydney and spent two years with Marsden. In 1817 Tītore and Tui (also known as Tuhi or Tupaea (1797?-1824)) sailed to England in the brig, Kangaroo. They visited Professor Samuel Lee at Cambridge University and assisted him in the preparation of a grammar and vocabulary of Māori which, following a visit to Lee by the Ngāpuhi chiefs Hongi Hika and Waikato, was published in 1820 as First Grammar and Vocabulary of the New Zealand Language.

Marsden was in the Bay of Islands in May 1820 when HMS Coromandel, under the command of Captain James Downie, arrived at the Bay of Islands from England for the purpose of procuring a cargo of timber in the Firth of Thames. When Coromandel sailed for the Thames a few days later, Marsden accompanied them on their voyage. Downie reported that while at the Bay of Islands whalers were in the practice of trading muskets and ammunition for pork and potatoes.

In 1820 Hongi Hika and Thomas Kendall travelled to England on the whaling ship . Hongi Hika met George IV, who gifted him a suit of armour; he also obtained further muskets when passing through Sydney on his return to New Zealand. On his return to the Bay of Islands, Ngāpuhi demanded the Church Missionary Society missionaries trade muskets for food, which under Kendall became an important means of support for the Kerikeri mission station. The trade was opposed by Marsden, largely because of its impact on the wide-ranging intertribal warfare occurring among Māori at the time.

For refusing to stop trading arms, Kendall was dismissed by the Church Missionary Society in 1822. Marsden, who also knew of Kendall's romantic affair, returned to New Zealand in August 1823 to sack him in person. When Marsden and Kendall sailed from the Bay of Islands, their ship the Brampton was wrecked. Marsden later went to some trouble talking to all Australian printers to prevent Kendall from publishing a Māori grammar book, apparently largely out of spite.

Legacy
Marsden is generally remembered favourably in New Zealand, which he visited seven times (the longest trip lasting seven months). The Anglican school, Samuel Marsden Collegiate School in Karori, Wellington was named after Marsden. Houses at King's College, Auckland, King's School, Auckland and at Corran School for Girls are also named after him.

In 1819, Marsden introduced winegrowing to New Zealand with the planting of over 100 different varieties of vine in Kerikeri, Northland. He wrote:

Later life

Marsden was on a visit to the Reverend Henry Stiles at St Matthew's Church at Windsor, New South Wales when he succumbed to an incipient chill and died at the rectory on 12 May 1838.

Marsden is buried in the cemetery near his old church at Parramatta, St John's.

In fiction and popular culture

The Australian poet Kenneth Slessor wrote a satirical poem criticising the parson, Vesper-Song of the Reverend Samuel Marsden.

A portrait of Marsden based on Robert Hughes' The Fatal Shore appears in Patrick O'Brian's book The Nutmeg of Consolation.

In the 1978 Australian television series Against the Wind, Marsden was portrayed by David Ravenswood.

Reggae band 1814 took their name from the year that Marsden held the first sermon in the Bay of Islands.

See also
 Thomas Hassall (clergyman)

References

Bibliography
  
 
 
 
 
 
 
 Ryder, M. L. (1973) "Samuel Marsden: Australian Pioneer, 1764-1838" History Today (Dec 1973), Vol. 23 Issue 12, pp 864–870 online.

External links

 Marsden Online Archive, University of Otago
 
 
 A Short Account of the Character and Labours of The Rev Samuel Marsden – National Museum of Australia
 Samuel Marsden's Preaching Bands – National Museum of Australia
 Colonial Secretary's papers 1822-1877, State Library of Queensland- includes digitised letters written by Marsden to the Colonial Secretary of New South Wales

1764 births
1838 deaths
19th-century English Anglican priests
Alumni of Magdalene College, Cambridge
Australian Anglican priests
Evangelical Anglican clergy
Evangelical Anglican theologians
People from Pudsey
Musket Wars
People from Parramatta
English emigrants to colonial Australia
English chaplains
Clergy from Leeds